is a Japanese Jazz singer, actress, author, gravure model and AV actress.

Life and career
Kei Marimura was born on August 29, 1957 in Chiyoda ward, Tokyo. Graduated from the Shōei Joshi Gakuin Junior and Senior High School, she made her debut as jazz singer in 1982 through the Toho College of Music.

She also worked as an actress, appearing in many movies, TV-dramas and V-Cinema releases. In 2009, at 52, she made her debut as AV actress with the label Alice Japan.

In 2011 she released her first novel, Intimacy (インティマシー).

Discography

Album 
 Elegance (1982, Disco-Mate, DSP-4006)
     Mood Indigo (1982, Disco-Mate, DSP-4007)
     The man I love (1983, Disco-Mate, DSP-5118)
     P.S. I Love you (1983, Teichiku / Continental, DSP-5120)
     Beautiful Dreamer (live, 1984, Disco-Mate, DSP-5121)
     Tiempo de Amor (1985, Continental, CI-40)
     La Califusa (1986, Continental, CI-41)
     Nouveau (1991, Teichiku, TECN-28082)
     Mucho Mucho (1992,Teichiku, TECN-30194)
     ブリリアント・ベスト (Best of, 2010, Teichiku, TECN-30211/2)

Filmography

Movies 
 Mysterious Country Japan (ふしぎな国日本, 1982)
 Yasha (夜叉, 1985)
 The most dangerous criminal (もっともあぶない刑事, 1989)
 Death Subeshi beast (野獣死すべし, 1997)
 Moonlight Whispers (月光の囁き, 1998)
 Girl came from the sea – Mermaid (マーメイド～海から来た少女, 2001), also written and directed
 Midday Flowers (真昼の花, 2005), singing

V-Cinema 
 Only evil (悪人専用, 1990)
      Symphony of the sensual wife Karuizawa (軽井沢夫人 官能の夜想曲, 1996)
      XX: Beautiful Prey  (ＸＸ　美しき獲物, 1996)
      Women (id., 1997)
      Another XX (アナザーXX, 1998)
      Ecstasy (エクスタシー, 2001)
      Red Spider (赤蜘蛛, 2004)

Gravure video 
     Shangai Rapsodhy (Bauhaus, 2002)
     Aventure (2004)

Adult video 
     Jyoji (September 25, 2009, Alice JAPAN)
     Jyoji II (March 12, 2010, Alice JAPAN)
     Lady Stockings (November 12, 2010, Alice JAPAN)
     Tokyo nightclub – Jyoji Beginning (November 11, 2011, Alice JAPAN)

Web series 
 Easy seeing (I have seen!) (見参楽（みさんが！）, 2011, DOUGA/Fuji TV)

Television 
 At night the mood (夜は気分で, 1982–1983) – Host
 We're funny family (オレたちひょうきん族, 1982–1983)
 Our first experience of wives (妻たちの初体験, 1986)
 Metropolitan at 25 (大都会25時, 1987)
 Tetsuko Room (徹子の部屋, 1987)
 One photograph (一枚の写真, 1991)
 Autumn murderer (秋の殺人者, 1995)
 Good Luck (グッドラック, 1996)
 Witch legend (鬼女伝説, 2003)
 Stay at the countryside! (田舎に泊まろう!, 2008)
 BS-TBS Imperial Jazz 2009 (2009)

Radio 
 Jazz Monthly wide (マンスリージャズワイド, TBS Radio)
 I Love NY

Bibliography 
 Intimacy (インティマシー, 2011, Tokuma Shoten)

Photo books 
 ドレス
     Imprevu
     Speak Low
     Higher Self
     R指定
     軽蔑
     BLACK BOX
     上海ラプソディー
     Pandora

References

External links 

1957 births
21st-century Japanese women writers
Japanese gravure idols
Japanese female adult models
Japanese pornographic film actresses
Living people
Actresses from Tokyo
Singers from Tokyo
People from Chiyoda, Tokyo
Japanese women jazz singers
Japanese women novelists
Japanese television personalities
20th-century Japanese actresses
21st-century Japanese actresses
20th-century Japanese women singers
20th-century Japanese singers